The 2022 Campeonato Pernambucano (officially the Pernambucano Betsson 2022 for sponsorship reasons) was the 108th edition of the state championship of Pernambuco organized by FPF. The championship began on 22 January and ended on 30 April 2022.

In the first stage, Sete de Setembro had three points deducted for fielding the ineligible player Bililiu in the match Sete de Setembro v Náutico played on 1 February 2022 (2nd round).

The finals were contested in two-legged home-and-away format between the defending champions Náutico and Retrô. Tied 1–1 on aggregate, Náutico won 4–2 on penalties, winning the tournament for the 24th time. As champions, Náutico qualified for 2023 Copa do Brasil and 2023 Copa do Nordeste. The runners-up, Retrô qualified for 2023 Copa do Brasil and 2023 Copa do Nordeste qualification, while Santa Cruz, the best placed team in the first stage not already qualified, gained the third berth for 2023 Copa do Brasil.

Teams

Ten teams were competing, eight returning from the 2021 and two promoted from the 2021 Pernambucano A2 Championship: Caruaru City and Íbis.

Schedule
The schedule of the competition was as follows.

First stage
In the first stage, each team played the other nine teams in a single round-robin tournament. The teams were ranked according to points (3 points for a win, 1 point for a draw, and 0 points for a loss). If tied on points, the following criteria would be used to determine the ranking: 1. Wins; 2. Goal difference; 3. Goals scored; 4. Fewest red cards; 5. Fewest yellow cards; 6. Draw in the headquarters of the FPF.

Top two teams advanced to the semi-finals of the final stages, while teams from third to sixth places advanced to the quarter-finals. The four teams with the lowest number of points played a relegation stage.

The best team not qualified for the finals qualified for 2023 Copa do Brasil. Top two teams not already qualified for 2023 Série A, Série B or Série C qualified for 2023 Série D.

Standings

Results

Relegation stage
In the relegation stage, each team played the other three teams in a single round-robin tournament. The teams were ranked according to points (3 points for a win, 1 point for a draw, and 0 points for a loss). If tied on points, the following criteria would be used to determine the ranking: 1. Wins; 2. Goal difference; 3. Goals scored; 4. Fewest red cards; 5. Fewest yellow cards; 6. Draw in the headquarters of the FPF.

Originally the two teams with the lowest number of points would be relegated to the 2023 Série A2 but the FPF allowed the relegated teams to participate in the 2022 Série A2.

Standings and Results

Final stages
Starting from the quarter-finals, the teams played a single-elimination tournament with the following rules:
Quarter-finals and semi-finals were played on a single-leg basis, with the higher-seeded team hosting the leg.
 If tied, the penalty shoot-out would be used to determine the winners.
Finals were played on a home-and-away two-legged basis, with the higher-seeded team hosting the second leg.
 If tied on aggregate, the penalty shoot-out would be used to determine the winners.
Extra time would not be played and away goals rule would not be used in final stages.
Third place match was not played.

Bracket

Quarter-finals

|}

Matches

Semi-finals

|}

Matches

Retrô qualified for the 2023 Copa do Brasil.

Náutico qualified for the 2023 Copa do Brasil.

Finals

|}

Matches

Náutico qualified for the 2023 Copa do Nordeste.

Overall table

Top goalscorers

2022 Campeonato Pernambucano team
The 2022 Campeonato Pernambucano team was a squad consisting of the eleven most impressive players at the tournament.

References

Campeonato Pernambucano seasons
Pernambucano
2022 in Brazilian football